Emerson Ferreira da Rosa (born 4 April 1976), simply known as Emerson, is a Brazilian former professional footballer who played as a defensive midfielder. At international level, he played 73 games for the Brazil national team between 1997 and 2006, scoring 6 goals. With Brazil, he has taken part in two FIFA World Cups (1998, 2006, missing out on the 2002 FIFA World Cup due to injury), two editions of the Copa América (1999, 2001), and three Confederations Cups (1999, 2003, 2005), winning the 1999 Copa América and the 2005 FIFA Confederations Cup, while also reaching the 1998 World Cup Final.

An experienced footballer who was nicknamed the Puma due to his powerful but elegant, ball-winning style of play, Emerson has played for two Brazilian clubs, Grêmio and Santos, as well as several European clubs in Germany, Italy, and Spain, including Bayer Leverkusen, Roma, Juventus, Real Madrid and Milan, winning several titles. In addition to his Brazilian passport, Emerson also holds Italian, German and Qatari passports.

Club career

Grêmio
Emerson made a name for himself in his native Brazil playing for Grêmio, where he won two state championships, two Brazilian Cups, one Brazilian Championship and one Copa Libertadores. He then went to Europe to play for German club Bayer Leverkusen.

Bayer Leverkusen
In 1997, Emerson was transferred to Bayer Leverkusen. He made his debut on 1 August 1997 against Schalke 04. Leverkusen finished in third place in the 1997–98 Bundesliga season. This was followed by two consecutive second-place finishes in the Bundesliga, behind champions Bayern Munich on both occasions. Emerson spent three years at Leverkusen, scoring 11 goals in 82 league appearances. On 13 August 1997, he made his debut in UEFA competitions in the qualifying round for the 1997–98 UEFA Champions League, in Bayer Leverkusen's 6–1 aggregate win over Dinamo Tbilisi. Leverkusen would eventually reach the Champions League quarter-finals, losing out to eventual champions Real Madrid. Emerson also reached the UEFA Cup round of 16 on two occasions with Leverkusen.

Roma
Emerson signed for Italian Serie A club Roma in the summer of 2000 for 35 billion Italian lire (€18.1 million by fixed exchange rate). He signed a five-year contract with an average salary of 7.2 billion Italian lire per year before tax. However, due to the quota imposed on non-EU players, Emerson was unable to play until Emerson acquired Italian nationality in October 2000, as his wife is Italian–Brazilian. Emerson made his Serie A debut in a 3–0 victory on 28 January 2001 against Napoli, replacing Marco Delvecchio in the 56th minute. Roma eventually won the Scudetto and the Supercoppa Italiana in 2001. Roma would also reach the Coppa Italia final during the 2002–03 season, losing out to Milan.

Juventus
After a prolonged transfer saga in which Roma wanted to sell Emerson to Real Madrid instead of Serie A rivals Juventus, Emerson was eventually sold to Juventus (which he preferred) in 2004 for €12 million plus Matteo Brighi (who was valued at €16 million), following in the footsteps of his former club coach, Fabio Capello. Moreover, an additional €4 million was paid to the agents, which made Emerson cost €32 million in total. Emerson won two consecutive Serie A titles with Juventus during the 2004–05 and the 2005–06 seasons, but both titles were revoked following the club's involvement in the 2006 Italian football scandal.

Real Madrid
After two seasons with Juventus, and following their relegation to Serie B due to their role in the 2006 Italian football scandal, Emerson moved to Real Madrid on 19 July 2006, again following Fabio Capello, costing Real Madrid €16 million. However, due to the declining relationship between Emerson and Capello and Emerson's poor performances for Real Madrid, in January 2007 Emerson stated his desire to return to Juventus, while it was rumoured he would be willing to take a pay cut.

However, by May, Emerson's performances had improved considerably, along with a great improvement in the team's results, and on 12 May 2007 he declared his intention to remain with Real Madrid. But in his conversation with the radio program El Larguero, Real Madrid club president Ramón Calderón said Emerson would leave Real Madrid in the summer (along with the Italian striker Antonio Cassano) for technical reasons. Emerson won La Liga in his only season with Real Madrid.

Milan
On 21 August 2007, Milan officially confirmed the transfer of Emerson for €6 million. He made his Milan debut in the club's 3–1 UEFA Super Cup victory over Sevilla on 31 August. However, Emerson was unable to contribute significantly to his new club due to injury, only managing 20 appearances for Milan in the 2007–08 season. Nonetheless, he was also able to win the 2007 FIFA Club World Cup with Milan. On 21 April 2009, he and the club mutually agreed to terminate his contract.

Immediately following his release, Emerson began negotiations with Grêmio with the aim of ending his career with his first club. However, due to international transfer restrictions, Emerson was unable to join Grêmio until August 2009 at the earliest.

Santos
After his release from Milan, on 26 July 2009 Emerson signed a contract with Santos. On 16 October 2009, Emerson decided to terminate his contract and leave Santos due to injury problems. Emerson then underwent surgery and retired from active competition.

Miami Dade FC
On 3 November 2015, Emerson announced he was joining Miami Dade FC of the American Premier Soccer League (APSL). On 7 May 2017, Emerson made his debut for Miami Dade alongside former Brazil national team player Gabriel in a 3–1 victory against Jupiter United. On 2 July, he won the 2017 Regular Season Championship, undefeated.

International career
Emerson made his Brazil debut on 10 September 1997, in a home friendly match against Ecuador, in Salvador, Bahia, also scoring a goal in the match, as Brazil went on to win 4–2. He was a late replacement for Romário at the 1998 FIFA World Cup following Romário's injury. The defending World Cup champions Brazil reached the final, losing 3–0 to hosts and eventual champions France. (Four years later, it would be Emerson who would miss out on a spot at the 2002 World Cup due to injury.)

The following year, Emerson won the 1999 Copa América with Brazil, as Brazil overcame Uruguay in the final. Emerson scored one goal during the tournament, in Brazil's 7–0 win in its opening group match against Venezuela. Brazil also reached the final of the 1999 FIFA Confederations Cup that year, where they lost the trophy to hosts Mexico in the final. Emerson scored his second international goal on 31 March 1999, in a friendly match against Japan in Tokyo, which Brazil won 2–0. Emerson scored his first double for Brazil on 23 February 2000 in a friendly match in Bangkok against Thailand, which Brazil won 7–0.

Emerson was intended to be the original captain for Brazil's 2002 World Cup team, but he suffered an unfortunate injury in training before the first match of the tournament, dislocating his shoulder when attempting to parry a shot by a teammate. He was replaced by Ricardinho of Corinthians, while Cafu replaced him as captain. Brazil would ultimately win the tournament.

In 2005, Emerson won the 2005 Confederations Cup with Brazil, who defeated South American rivals Argentina 4–1 in the final, as well as overcoming hosts Germany 3–2 in the semi-finals. On 30 March 2005, Emerson scored a goal in an away 1–1 draw against Uruguay in a 2006 World Cup qualifying match. In the 2006 World Cup, he played in three of Brazil's five matches at the tournament, appearing in Brazil's two opening wins over Croatia and Australia during the group stage, while he was rested in the final group match against Japan, which Brazil won 4–1. He also appeared in Brazil's 3–0 round of 16 victory over Ghana, although he was taken off in the 46th minute after sustaining an injury. This would be Emerson's final match for Brazil. Brazil were eventually knocked out in the quarter-finals by eventual finalists France. Emerson was excluded from the starting line-up in Brazil's quarter-final match due to injury.

After the 2006 World Cup, Emerson retired from the national team, having scored 6 goals in 73 appearances. In addition to the aforementioned tournaments, Emerson also represented Brazil in the 2001 Copa América, in Colombia, where Brazil lost in the quarter-finals to Honduras; and in the 2003 Confederations Cup in France, where Brazil was surprisingly eliminated in the first round, finishing third in their group.

Playing style
Emerson was an experienced, quick, combative, hardworking and dynamic player, who was capable of being deployed in several midfield positions. He played as a central midfielder, and as a box-to-box midfielder on occasion, although his main position was that of a defensive midfielder, who was renowned for breaking down the opposition's play through his efficient tackling, stamina, anticipation, and ability to read the game. He was also capable of subsequently starting up attacking plays once he won back possession, due to his quick and effective passing style, as well as his technique. These attributes led to his nickname Il Puma for his elegant, yet powerful, feline movements when chasing down opponents in midfield. He was also gifted with a powerful and accurate shot from distance, although he was also known to be injury prone.

Career statistics

Club

International

Scores and results list Brazil's goal tally first, score column indicates score after each Emerson goal.

Honours

Club
Grêmio
Série A: 1996
Copa do Brasil: 1994, 1997
Copa Libertadores: 1995
Recopa Sudamericana: 1996

Roma
Serie A: 2000–01
Supercoppa Italiana: 2001

Real Madrid
La Liga: 2006–07

Milan
UEFA Super Cup: 2007
FIFA Club World Cup: 2007

Miami Dade FC
APSL Regular Season: 2016
APSL Regular Season: 2017
APSL Champions: 2017

International
Brazil
FIFA World Cup: 1998 (runners-up)
Copa América: 1999
FIFA Confederations Cup: 2005

Individual
kicker Bundesliga Team of the Season: 1999–2000

References

External links

 
 

1976 births
Living people
People from Pelotas
Brazilian footballers
Association football midfielders
Grêmio Foot-Ball Porto Alegrense players
Bayer 04 Leverkusen players
A.S. Roma players
Juventus F.C. players
Real Madrid CF players
A.C. Milan players
Santos FC players
Miami Dade FC players
Campeonato Brasileiro Série A players
Bundesliga players
Serie A players
La Liga players
United Premier Soccer League players
Brazil international footballers
1998 FIFA World Cup players
1999 Copa América players
1999 FIFA Confederations Cup players
2001 Copa América players
2003 FIFA Confederations Cup players
2005 FIFA Confederations Cup players
2006 FIFA World Cup players
Copa América-winning players
Copa Libertadores-winning players
FIFA Confederations Cup-winning players
Naturalised citizens of Italy
Brazilian expatriate footballers
Brazilian expatriate sportspeople in Germany
Brazilian expatriate sportspeople in Italy
Brazilian expatriate sportspeople in Spain
Brazilian expatriate sportspeople in the United States
Expatriate footballers in Germany
Expatriate footballers in Italy
Expatriate footballers in Spain
Expatriate soccer players in the United States
Sportspeople from Rio Grande do Sul